D2D may refer to:

Technology
 Device-to-device, proximity-based direct communications between mobile nodes orchestrated by the cellular operator
 Direct2D, a hardware-accelerated 2D API built on top of Direct3D 10
 Direct2Drive, an online video game and entertainment distributor and retail store

Other uses
 Door-to-door, a sales or political technique for engaging an audience
 Dot to Dot Festival, a music festival in the United Kingdom
 Delhi 2 Dublin, a Canadian world music band